Enallagma cardenium, the purple bluet, is a species of narrow-winged damselfly in the family Coenagrionidae. It is found in the Caribbean and North America.

The IUCN conservation status of Enallagma cardenium is "LC", least concern, with no immediate threat to the species' survival. The population is stable.

References

Further reading

 
 

Coenagrionidae
Insects described in 1876